Calytrix paucicostata is a species of plant in the myrtle family Myrtaceae that is endemic to Western Australia.

It usually blooms between September and October producing yellow-pink star-shaped flowers.

Found on sand dunes in a small area along the west coast in the Mid West region of Western Australia near Northhampton where it grows on sandy soils.
 
The species was first formally described by the botanist Lyndley Craven in 1987 in the article A taxonomic revision of Calytrix Labill. (Myrtaceae) in the journal Brunonia.

References

Plants described in 1987
paucicostata
Flora of Western Australia